The Paleo-European languages, or Old European languages, are the mostly unknown languages that were spoken in Europe prior to the spread of the Indo-European and Uralic families caused by the Bronze Age invasion from the Eurasian steppe of pastoralists whose descendant languages dominate the continent today. Today, the vast majority of European populations speak Indo-European languages, but until the Bronze Age, it was the opposite, with Paleo-European languages of non-Indo-European affiliation dominating the linguistic landscape of Europe.

The term Old European languages is also often used more narrowly to refer only to the unknown languages of the first Neolithic European farmers in Southeastern, Southern, Central and Western Europe, who emigrated from Anatolia around 8000–6000 BC, excluding unknown languages of various European hunter gatherers who were eventually absorbed by farming populations by the late Neolithic Age.

A similar term, Pre-Indo-European, is used to refer to the disparate languages mostly displaced by speakers of Proto-Indo-European as they migrated out of their Urheimat. This term thus includes certain Paleo-European languages along with many others spoken in West Asia, Central Asia, and South Asia before the Proto-Indo-Europeans and their descendants arrived.

Traces of lost Paleo-European languages
The prehistoric Paleolithic and Mesolithic modern human hunter-gatherer Paleo-European languages and Neolithic Anatolian and European farmer languages are not attested in writing (but see Old European script for a set of undeciphered signs that were used in the Vinča culture, which may or may not have been a writing system). The only sources for some of them are place names and especially river names that are found all over central and western Europe, and possibly loanwords in some Indo-European languages now spoken there.

Attested Paleo-European languages and reconstructed substrates

Paleohispanic languages 

 Basque (Euskara) – the only surviving language
 Aquitanian – A close relative to, or a direct ancestor of, Modern Basque.
 Proto-Basque
 Iberian – Perhaps a relative to Aquitanian and Basque: maybe even ancestral to both, but not confirmed.
 Tartessian – Unclassified: possibly related to Iberian, if not related to Indo-European.

Other Paleohispanic languages can only be identified indirectly through toponyms, anthroponyms or theonyms cited by Roman and Greek sources. Most inscriptions were found written in the Phoenician or Greek alphabets. Little or no evidence of paleo-alphabets or hieroglyphics is found today; the little material that exists is mostly indecipherable.

Paleo-European languages of Italy 

 Tyrsenian languages
 Etruscan – in northern and central Italy
 Raetic – in northern Italy and Austria
 Lemnian – in Aegean area
 Camunic
 Paleo-Sardinian language – possibly related to the extinct native Iberian language of the Iberian peninsula
 Ligurian
 North Picene language
 Sicanian language

Paleo-European languages of the Aegean area 
 Pre-Greek substrate
 Minoan
 Eteocretan may be a descendant of Minoan, but this is uncertain
 Cypro-Minoan
 Eteocypriot may be a descendant of Cypro-Minoan
 Language of the Phaistos Disc, possibly one of the above

North Europe 
 Germanic substrate hypothesis
 Britain and Ireland
 Goidelic substrate hypothesis
 Pre-Finno-Ugric substrate
 Pre-Sami substrate(s) – one or more substrate languages underlying the Sami languages, perhaps based on geographical location
Palaeo-Laplandic
 Pre-Finnic substrate – underlies the development of Proto-Finnic; possibly related to the substrate in Sami

Other 
Vasconic substratum hypothesis
Albanian substratum hypothesis – possibly related to the substrate in Greek

Sometimes Caucasian languages are also included in Paleo-European, but the Caucasus region is often considered to be a natural barrier or border region between Asia and Europe.

Neolithic 
There is no direct evidence of the languages spoken in the Neolithic. Paleolinguistic attempts to extend the methods of historical linguistics to the Stone Age have little academic support. Donald Ringe, criticizing scenarios that envision only a small number of Neolithic language families spread over huge areas of Europe, has argued on general principles of language geography applying to "tribal" pre-state societies, and the scant remains of non-Indo-European languages attested in ancient inscriptions, that Neolithic Europe must have been a place of great linguistic diversity, with many language families having no recoverable linguistic links to one another, much like western North America before European colonisation.

Discussion of hypothetical languages spoken in the European Neolithic is divided into two topics: Indo-European languages and "Pre-Indo-European" languages.

Early Indo-European languages are usually assumed to have reached Europe in the Chalcolithic or early Bronze Age, with the Yamnaya, Corded Ware or Beaker cultures (see also Kurgan hypothesis for related discussions). The Anatolian hypothesis postulates arrival of Indo-European languages with the early Neolithic. Conversely, the Kurgan hypothesis maintains that the Indo-European languages arrived in Europe no earlier than the Bronze Age, which is consistent with the findings of genome-wide analysis research published in 2015. Old European hydronymy is taken by Hans Krahe to be the oldest reflection of the early presence of Indo-European in Europe.

Theories of "Pre-Indo-European" languages in Europe are built on scant evidence. Basque is a candidate for a descendant of such a language, but since Basque is a language isolate, there is no comparative evidence to build upon. Vennemann nevertheless postulates a "Vasconic" family, which he supposes had co-existed with an "Atlantic" or "Semitidic" (i.e., para-Semitic) group. The theory, however, is rejected by mainstream linguists. Another candidate is the Tyrsenian languages, which would have given rise to Etruscan and Raetic in the Iron Age. It cannot be ruled out that there were several different language families already in the Neolithic period. 

In the north, a similar scenario to Indo-European is thought to have occurred, with Uralic languages expanding in from the east. In particular, while the Sami languages of the indigenous Sami people belong in the Uralic family, they show considerable substrate influence, which is thought to represent one or more extinct older languages. The ancestors of Sami are estimated to have adopted a Uralic language less than 2500 years ago. Some traces of indigenous languages of the Baltic area have been suspected in the Finnic languages as well, but they are much more modest. There are early loanwords from unidentified non-Indo-European languages in other Uralic languages of Europe, as well.

See also
Pre–Indo-European languages
Old Europe

References

Sources

Further reading

Unclassified languages of Europe
Extinct languages of Europe
Pre-Indo-European languages